Ugolino II Trinci (also Ugolino Novello) (died 1353) was the lord of Foligno from 1343 until his death. He was the son of Nallo I Trinci and succeeded his brother Corrado I in the lordship in 1343.

Ugolino was succeeded by his son Trincia. His other sons Corrado and Rinaldo were later, respectively, lord of Foligno and bishop of Foligno.

References
 History of Foligno

Trinci, Ugolino 2
Ugolino 2
Lords of Foligno
Year of birth unknown